Samuele Romeo (born 6 March 1989) is an Italian professional football player who plays for Nuorese.

Career
A youth product of Palermo, Romeo was signed by Lumezzane in a temporary deal on 10 July 2009.

In January 2014 Romeo was sold to Juve Stabia, with Luca Martinelli moved to Empoli. Both players were priced for €1.5 million.

On 25 August 2016 he was signed by Mantova in a 1-year deal.

He played for Serie D club Lupa Roma from September to December 2018.

On 4 February 2019, Romeo joined S.E.F. Torres 1903. In August 2019, he then joined S.S.D. Marsala Calcio. However, Romeo announced on 8 November 2019, that his contract had been terminated by mutual agreement. On 11 January 2020, he moved to Eccellenza club Nuorese.

References

External links
 
 

1989 births
Living people
Italian footballers
F.C. Lumezzane V.G.Z. A.S.D. players
U.S. Alessandria Calcio 1912 players
A.S.D. Sorrento players
Empoli F.C. players
S.S. Juve Stabia players
Mantova 1911 players
A.S. Melfi players
Latina Calcio 1932 players
Lupa Roma F.C. players
S.E.F. Torres 1903 players
S.S.D. Marsala Calcio players
Nuorese Calcio players
Serie B players
Serie C players
Serie D players
Association football defenders